The biennial Charlotte mayoral election was held on Tuesday, November 8, 2011. Democratic incumbent Anthony Foxx won re-election.

Candidates
Only two candidates filed to run for the office: Anthony Foxx, Democratic incumbent mayor since 2009, and Republican Scott Stone, vice president of an engineering firm.  Since they were the only candidates to file for their respective party's nomination, they faced no primaries.

Election results

References

External links
Mecklenburg County Board of Elections
Anthony Foxx for Mayor campaign site.
Scott Stone for Mayor campaign site.

2011
Charlotte mayoral
Charlotte